Otakadoyayama Transmitter (おおたかどや山標準電波送信所) is an LF-time signal transmitter at Tamura-City, Fukushima-ken, Japan used for transmitting the time signal JJY on 40 kHz. The Otakadoyama site is one of two JJY transmitters, another is the Haganeyama site.

Summy 
 NAME：NICT Otakadoyayama LF station
 Location：Summit of Mt. Otakadoya, Tamura-City, Fukushima-ken
 Elevation：about 790m
 Latitude：37°22'21.0"N
 Longitude：140°50'56.0"E
 License：NICT
 Station purpose：Transmitting the official Japanese government frequency standards and time signal
 Frequency form：250H A1B
 Frequency：40kHz
 Antenna power：50kW（Antenna efficiency: about 45%）
 Antenna form：Umbrella type 250m high
 Operation time：continuously
 Operation start：1999/06/01
 Range：About 1,000 km
 Transmission method :

See also
 Haganeyama Transmitter

Reference

External links
 http://jjy.nict.go.jp/jjy/trans/index-e.html

 

Towers in Japan
Radio masts and towers